Cirilo B. Flores (June 20, 1948 – September 6, 2014) was an American prelate of the Roman Catholic Church who served as bishop of the Diocese of San Diego in California from 2013 until his death in 2014. He previously served as coadjutor bishop of the same diocese from 2012 until 2013 and as an auxiliary bishop of the Diocese of Orange in California from 2009 until 2012.

Biography

Early life 
Cirilo Flores was born in Corona, California; one of six children, he had three brothers and two sisters. His father was from Sinaloa, Mexico. He attended the Corona School District and St. Edward School. After graduating from Notre Dame High School in Riverside, California, in 1966, he studied at Loyola Marymount University in Los Angeles. In 1968, Flores entered the novitiate of the Society of Jesus, but left to pursue a legal career. He completed his bachelor's degree at Loyola Marymount University in 1970. Flores later said, "I went in conflicted to begin with. I couldn't decide if I wanted to be a priest or a lawyer."

Flores then entered Stanford University School of Law, earning his Juris Doctor in 1976. He then practiced law in Southern California for ten years, focusing on business litigation. He also worked at firms in Beverly Hills and Newport Beach. Feeling a returning call to the priesthood, he entered St. John's Seminary in Camarillo, California, in 1986, receiving a Master of Divinity (M.Div.) degree, the prerequisite to presbyteral ordination.

Priesthood 
Flores was ordained a priest for the Diocese of Orange by Bishop Norman McFarland on June 8, 1991.  Flores served as parochial vicar at St. Barbara Parish in Santa Ana, California, and at St. Joachim Parish in Costa Mesa, California.

After briefly serving as the administrator of Our Lady of Mt. Carmel Parish in Newport Beach, Flores became parochial vicar of Our Lady of Guadalupe Parish in La Habra, California, in 1997. He was named pastor of St. Anne Parish in Santa Ana, California, in July 2000, and later of St. Norbert Parish in Orange in September 2008.

Flores was also a member of the Diocesan Finance Council, Clergy Personnel Board, and editorial board of the Orange diocesan newspaper, the Orange County Catholic.

Flores was a commander of the Equestrian Order of the Holy Sepulchre of Jerusalem.

Auxiliary bishop of Orange 
On January 5, 2009, Flores was appointed as an auxiliary bishop of the Diocese of Orange and Titular Bishop of Quiza by Pope Benedict XVI. He received his episcopal consecration on March 19, 2009, from Bishop Tod Brown, with Bishops Dominic Mai Luong and Norman McFarland serving as co-consecrators, at St. Columban Church in Garden Grove, California. Flores selected as his episcopal motto: "For the Greater Glory of God."

Coadjutor Bishop and Bishop of San Diego
On January 4, 2012, the apostolic nuncio to the United States announced that Flores had been named by Pope Benedict VI as the coadjutor bishop of the Diocese of San Diego, with immediate right of succession to San Diego bishop Robert Henry Brom, who reached his mandatory retirement age in 2013.On September 18, 2013, Pope Francis accepted the resignation of Bishop Brom, and Flores automatically succeeded him as bishop of San Diego.

On April 16, 2014, Flores suffered a stroke in his office at the Pastoral Center and was rushed to a hospital, where he was said to be "alert and in good spirits".   Flores was expected to receive "treatment for a few days before his release," the diocese announced .    The statement asked for prayers for the bishop's "speedy and full recovery". On September 4, 2014, it was reported that Flores was suffering from aggressive cancer.  He was not considered a good candidate for treatment and instead was receiving palliative care in San Diego.

Cirilo Flores died on September 6, 2014, at Nazareth House in San Diego. At his bedside were his cousin Dr. Tom Martinez, Monsignor Steven Callahan and Sisters of Nazareth.

References

1948 births
2014 deaths
People from Corona, California
Loyola Marymount University alumni
Stanford Law School alumni
St. John's Seminary (California) alumni
California lawyers
21st-century Roman Catholic bishops in the United States
Roman Catholic Diocese of Orange
Roman Catholic bishops of San Diego
Deaths from cancer in California
20th-century American lawyers